JC Comics (also known as JC Productions) was a comic book company primarily involved with the post-Silver Age iteration of the characters the T.H.U.N.D.E.R. Agents. JC Comics was owned by John Carbonaro (Sept. 30, 1951 – Feb. 25, 2009).

History

Acquisition of T.H.U.N.D.E.R. Agents rights 
Carbonaro acquired the rights to the T.H.U.N.D.E.R. Agents from the defunct Tower Comics, and tried to relaunch them with his own comic book company.

Association with Archie 
Shortly after acquiring the T.H.U.N.D.E.R. Agents rights, Carbonaro made an arrangement with Archie Comics to print and distribute JC Comics' titles, in conjunction with Archie's own attempted relaunch of their old superhero imprint Red Circle Comics. This resulted in cross-advertisements between the two companies and appearances of the companies' characters in each other's titles. Although Carbonaro was hired as an editor at Archie, Archie never owned the T.H.U.N.D.E.R. Agents characters; nor was JC Comics an Archie imprint.

From 1981 to 1984, JC Comics published three T.H.U.N.D.E.R. Agents titles: JCP Features, a single issue featuring early work by the artist Mark Texeira (which also contained an Archie Black Hood reprint); Hall of Fame Featuring the T.H.U.N.D.E.R. Agents, a three-issue series reprinting stories from the titular superhero team's original 1960s Tower Comics series, with new covers by artists including Steve Ditko and Bob Layton; and the two-issue series T.H.U.N.D.E.R. Agents, featuring new stories. Ultimately, the wrap-up story of the latter series appeared in Red Circle's Blue Ribbon Comics anthology title.

During this period, JC Comics also published a single issue of Basically Strange, a black-and-white horror comics magazine featuring artist Rick Bryant and writer-artist Bruce Jones.

Texas Comics 
Also in 1983, Carbonaro arranged for the T.H.U.N.D.E.R. Agents to appear in a crossover adventure with Justice Machine in Justice Machine Annual #1, then being published by Texas Comics.

Dispute with Deluxe Comics 
In 1984, a former associate of Carbonaro named David M. Singer claimed that the T.H.U.N.D.E.R. Agent characters were in the public domain. He founded Deluxe Comics and began publishing a new series, Wally Wood's T.H.U.N.D.E.R. Agents, featuring top artists including George Pérez, Dave Cockrum, Keith Giffen, Murphy Anderson, and Jerry Ordway. A lawsuit by Carbonaro asserting his copyright and trademark rights was heard in the federal district court for the Southern District of New York (John Carbonaro, et. al. v. David Singer, et. al., 84 Civ. 8737 (S.D.N.Y.), and via summary judgment, the judge ruled from the bench that the T.H.U.N.D.E.R. Agents were indeed Carbonaro's property. Under the settlement, Carbonaro received an assignment of all rights to Wally Woods T.H.U.N.D.E.R. Agents, and an undisclosed sum of money.

Omni Comix 
Over the years, JC Comics tried many times to launch new T.H.U.N.D.E.R. Agents material. A 1995 deal with Penthouse Comix resulted in a single story in Omni Comix.

Later attempts 
In the early 2000s another attempt to revive the characters was planned with DC Comics, but the T.H.U.N.D.E.R. Agents Archive and some statutettes are all that came of it.

Following Carbonaro's 2009 death, DC briefly licensed the rights to the T.H.U.N.D.E.R. Agents from owners Radiant Assets, and they have since been licensed by IDW Publishing.

Titles 
 Published by JC Comics
 JCP Features a.k.a. JCP Features the T.H.U.N.D.E.R. Agents #1 (cover-date Dec. 1981)
 Basically Strange #1 (dated Nov. 1982 in copyright indicia, but cover-dated Dec. 1982)
 Hall of Fame Featuring the T.H.U.N.D.E.R. Agents (3 issues, May-Dec. 1983)
 T.H.U.N.D.E.R. Agents (2 issues, May 1983–Jan. 1984)

 Published by Archie Comics/Red Circle Comics
 Blue Ribbon Comics #12 (1983)

 Published by Texas Comics
 Justice Machine Annual #1 (1983)

 Published by Penthouse Comics
 Omni Comix #3 (Oct.–Nov. 1995)

 Published by DC Comics (DC Archive Editions)
 T.H.U.N.D.E.R. Agents Archive, vol. 1 (2002), 
 T.H.U.N.D.E.R. Agents Archive, vol. 2
 T.H.U.N.D.E.R. Agents Archive, vol. 3
 T.H.U.N.D.E.R. Agents Archive, vol. 4
 T.H.U.N.D.E.R. Agents Archive, vol. 5
 T.H.U.N.D.E.R. Agents Archive, vol. 6

Notes

References

External links 
 
 
 "John Carbonaro is dead (miss, him, miss him)", Freelance Ink blog (March 7, 2009)

Comic book publishing companies of the United States
Defunct comics and manga publishing companies
Publishing companies established in 1981